Babij, Babiy and Babii are transliterations of the Ukrainian surname Бабій. Notable people with the surname include:

 Ivan Babij (1893–1934), Ukrainian educator and activist
 Oleksandr Babiy (born 1968), retired Ukrainian football player
 Olga Babiy (Kalinina; born 1989), Ukrainian chess player